Two former city hall buildings in Vallejo, California are listed in the National Register of Historic Places. Today the old city hall built in 1872 partially houses the Temple Art Lofts, a combination art gallery and apartment complex, and the 1927 city hall houses the Vallejo Naval and Historical Museum.

References

Vallejo, California
Former seats of local government
Town halls in California
National Register of Historic Places in Solano County, California